The Capital District Health Authority (shortened to Capital Health or the Capital Health District) was the largest of the nine health authorities in the Canadian province of Nova Scotia. In 2015 it was merged into the new, province-wide Nova Scotia Health Authority.

Service
Capital Health was responsible for delivering core health services in the Halifax Regional Municipality and in the Municipality of the District of West Hants, an area consisting of over 400,000 residents, or 40% of the provincial population. It also delivered tertiary and quaternary acute care services to residents throughout Atlantic Canada as a result of being the location of the region's largest teaching hospitals that make the city a major referral option for the provinces of New Brunswick, Prince Edward Island and Newfoundland and Labrador.

Facilities
 Cobequid Community Health Centre (Lower Sackville)
 Dartmouth General Hospital (Dartmouth)
 East Coast Forensic Hospital (Dartmouth)
 Eastern Shore Memorial Hospital (Sheet Harbour)
 Hants Community Hospital (Windsor)
 Musquodoboit Valley Memorial Hospital (Middle Musquodoboit)
 Nova Scotia Environmental Health Centre (Fall River)
 Queen Elizabeth II Health Sciences Centre (Halifax)
 Halifax Infirmary Site
Abbie J. Lane
Camp Hill Veterans' Memorial
Halifax Infirmary
Victoria General Site
Bethune
Centennial
Centre for Clinical Research
Dickson
Mackenzie
Nova Scotia Rehabilitation Centre
Victoria
 Nova Scotia Hospital (Dartmouth)
 Twin Oaks Memorial Hospital (Musquodoboit Harbour)

Administration
The President and Chief Executive Officer of the Capital District Health Authority is Chris Power, a nurse with broad experience in primary health care and in health care administration.

Capital Health has seven volunteer Community Health Boards that advise the district administrators and encourage public participation in health planning.

Capital Health employs approximately 9,985 staff. and is affiliated with the Dalhousie University Faculty of Medicine.

Capital Health operates a charitable foundation which is chaired by Constance Glube, the 21st Chief Justice of Nova Scotia.

The District was an important participant in the 2004 Baker and Norton paper, printed in the Canadian Medical Association Journal on Health System error.

External links
 Official website

Health in Halifax, Nova Scotia
Health regions of Nova Scotia